Lead market is a term used in innovation theory and denotes a country or region, which pioneers the successful adoption of an innovative design. It sends signalling effects to other "lag" markets, which in turn helps in triggering a process of global diffusion. Marian Beise, one of the foremost propounders of this theory as it has been understood so far, states: "Innovations that have been successful with local users in lead markets have a higher potential of becoming adopted world-wide than any other design preferred in other countries". Christoph Bartlett and Sumantra Ghoshal have described lead markets as "[…] markets that provide the stimuli for most global products and processes of a multinational company. Local innovations in such markets become useful elsewhere as the environmental characteristics that stimulated such innovations diffuse to other locations".  To illustrate a lead market with some examples, Germany can be seen as a lead market for renewable energies and (premium) automobiles, while the United States would suit as a lead market for information technologies including e-commerce.

Lead markets are thought to help reduce market and technology uncertainty in the process of new product development;  and can be seen as an important driver for internationalization of research and development (R&D).

Lead markets have been supposed to be characterized by factors such as high per capita income, high level of customer sophistication, and a competitive "eco-system". Such factors are subsumed into 5 "groups of advantages", namely demand advantage, market structure advantage, cost advantage, export advantage, and transfer advantage. Some scholars have also spoken of a regulation advantage, which emanates from favourable government policies (cf. Rennings and Smidt, 2010). Nevertheless, some other scholars have pointed towards regulation's impact on all other factors. For example, Tiwari and Herstatt (2012: 100) state: "[...] we consider it appropriate, not to treat regulation as a separate group since policy factors influence all other groups of advantages and are implicitly covered by them."

The theory of lead markets has been criticized for not being "consistent and stringent". While conventional wisdom, due to its emphasis on customer affluence and sophistication as inducers of innovation, has tended to see lead markets exist in economically highly developed countries; recent research, notably by Rajnish Tiwari and Cornelius Herstatt of Hamburg University of Technology (e.g. Tiwari and Herstatt, 2011a, Tiwari and Herstatt, 2011b), has emphasized the need to update/extend the lead market model to adjust it to the changing ground realities in the face of globalization and sustained economic growth in developing nations. Using examples of several frugal innovations from India, and more specifically the case of small car industry in India's automotive sector, Rajnish Tiwari in his dissertation at Hamburg University of Technology (TUHH) has proposed that lead markets can emerge in developing nations as well provided the market size enables significant economies of scale and the country's innovation system is endowed with the necessary technological capabilities. These two conditions, seen in conjunction with several other factors such as embeddedness in the international trade and access to open global innovation networks (OGINs), can in many instances compensate other typical drawbacks of developing countries, such as low purchasing power. As a consequence, Tiwari's dissertation has proposed to update the model to include technology advantage in the model, while combining the export and transfer advantages as one single group. Factors within the individual groups of advantages have been also update/modified. The evolution of India's small car sector has also provided some valuable insights into possible emergence of a lead market in a country. This model, if validated by further research, would help enable an ex ante analysis of lead markets, whereas so far mostly ex post, macroeconomic analyses have been the norm.

The original lead market framework by Beise follows the a priori assumption that lead markets emerge on the national level. As this might not hold for every empirical case, research in economic geography suggests to add more spatial sensitivity to the framework. This has led to a refined version, the so-called concept of Regional Lead Markets.

References

External links
 Lead Markets: The Global Diffusion of Environmental Innovations, project website, Centre for European Economic Research (ZEW), Mannheim.
 Lead Market-Strategies: First Mover, Early Follower, and Late Follower, project website, FU Berlin
 Lead Market Strategies: First Mover, Early Follower, Late Follower / Lead Market Strategies and Systems Dynamic, Fraunhofer, ISI.
 Lead Market Initiative, a part of the programme "Industrial innovation: Demand-side policies", European Commission.
 Lead Market Strategien, FONA: Economics for Sustainability, a project of Germany's Federal Ministry of Education and Research.
 Lead Market Research: Adjusting to Changing & Emerging Ground Realities, Research Project Global Innovation, Hamburg University of Technology.
 Tiwari, R. and Herstatt, C. (2012): Open Global Innovation Networks as Enablers of Frugal Innovation: Propositions Based on Evidence from India, Working Paper No. 72, Institute for Technology and Innovation Management, Hamburg University of Technology.
 Tiwari, R. and Herstatt, C. (2011): Frugal Innovations for the 'Unserved' Customer: An Assessment of India's Attractiveness as a Lead Market for Cost-effective Products, Working Paper No. 69, Institute for Technology and Innovation Management, Hamburg University of Technology.
 Tiwari, R. and Herstatt, C. (2011): India - A Lead Market for Frugal Innovations? Extending the Lead Market Theory to Emerging Economies, Working Paper No. 67, Institute for Technology and Innovation Management, Hamburg University of Technology.

Innovation